Plano Station, Texas Electric Railway, now known as the Interurban Railway Museum, is a historic train station at 901 E 15th Street in Plano, Texas. It is still served by the Downtown Plano station of the Dallas Area Rapid Transit light rail, which reutilized the right of way of the interurban.

The Mission Revival/Spanish Revival style station was completed in 1908 at the opening of the Texas Electric Railway. The railway operated from 1908 to 1948. The station stood vacant until the City of Plano renovated it into the Interurban Railway Museum in 1990. The building was added to the National Register of Historic Places on August 10, 2005. The museum also displays Car 360, a restored railcar of the Texas Electric Railway, on the grounds.

Management

The Plano Conservancy for Historic Preservation, Inc. has managed the Interurban Railway Museum since 2001 in partnership with the City of Plano. In an agreement with the City of Plano, the Plano Conservancy was allowed to operate the Museum in exchange for office space. During the first year of operation, the Plano Conservancy established enough credibility to receive funding under the hotel/motel tax provisions of the City of Plano.

Gallery

See also

National Register of Historic Places listings in Collin County, Texas
Recorded Texas Historic Landmarks in Collin County

References

External links

Interurban Railway Museum - Interurban Railway Museum
Station information

Museums in Collin County, Texas
Railway stations on the National Register of Historic Places in Texas
Railway stations in the United States opened in 1908
Buildings and structures in Plano, Texas
Railroad museums in Texas
History of Plano, Texas
Transportation in Plano, Texas
National Register of Historic Places in Collin County, Texas
Recorded Texas Historic Landmarks
1908 establishments in Texas
Former railway stations in Texas